Gudrun Landgrebe (born 20 June 1950) is a German actress.

Landgrebe was born in Göttingen, grew up in Bochum, and attended theatre school in Cologne from 1968 until 1971. In 1971 she made her debut at Stadttheater Bielefeld. She also appeared in Heimat as the character Klärchen Sisse.  Since 1981 she has frequently appeared in German movies - her first film role was in the comedy .  In 1983 she gained international fame in the Robert van Ackerens movie Die flambierte Frau.  Further movies such as Istvan Szabo's Oberst Redl (1985), Yerma (1984) and Burkhard Driest's  (1984) followed.  In 1985 she appeared alongside Kevin McNally in Liliana Cavani's The Berlin Affair.

She appeared in 1998 in the TV movie Opera Ball with Heiner Lauterbach and Franka Potente.

Landgrebe has been married to Dr. Ulrich von Nathusius since June 2001 and lives in Hunsrück.

Selected filmography

External links 
 
 

1950 births
Living people
Actors from Göttingen
German stage actresses
German film actresses
German television actresses
20th-century German actresses
21st-century German actresses